Mughallis was a Palestinian Arab village located  northwest of Hebron. It was depopulated during the 1948 Arab-Israeli War between July 9–10, 1948 as part of Operation An-Far.

History

Ottoman era
It was incorporated into the Ottoman Empire in 1517 with the rest of Palestine, and by the 1596 tax records it was located it nahiya (subdistrict) of Gaza, part of  Gaza Sanjak, with a population of 77 household, an estimated 424 persons, all Muslims. The villagers paid  a fixed tax-rate of 25% on agricultural products, including  wheat, barley, summer crops, fruit trees, goats and beehives, in addition to occasional revenues; a total of 10,350 akçe. All of the revenue went to a Waqf.

In May 1863 Victor Guérin described it as a  hamlet, still inhabited by a few families, and was  designated to him by the name of Deir al Mokhalles, which Guérin translated as the Convent of the Saviour. He noted that the name probably derived  from a former convent, which formerly existed at the place. 

An Ottoman village list of about 1870 showed that Meghallis  had 27 houses and a population of 71, though the population count included men, only.  

In 1882, the PEF's Survey of Western Palestine (SWP) described Mughullis as: "A village of moderate size, approached by an ancient road, and principally consisting of stone houses."

British Mandate era
In the 1922 census of Palestine, conducted by the  British Mandate for Palestine, the population was recorded as 311 Muslims, increasing in the 1931 census to  447 Muslims, in 93 houses. 

In the 1945 statistics it had a population of 540 Muslims, with 11,459  dunams of land.   88 dunams were plantations and irrigable land,  7,277  for cereals, while 23 dunams were built-up (urban) land.

1948, aftermath
Mughallis became depopulated on July 9–10, 1948.  On 16 July, Giv‘ati HQ informed General Staff\Operations that "our forces have entered the villages of Qazaza, Kheima, Jilya, ‘Idnibba and  Mughallis, expelled the inhabitants, [and] blown up and torched a number of houses. The area is at the moment clear of Arabs."

The IDF were instructed to prevent infiltration to Summeil, Barqusya, Bi‘lin, Masmiya al Saghira, al Tina, Kheima, Idnibba, Jilya, Qazaza, and Mughallis. The orders specifically were to "destroy" any "armed force" encountered and to "expel.....unarmed villagers". During the following days, patrols expelled refugees near Tel as Safi, al Tina, and Mughallis, apparently killing three of those initially detained. In mid August 1948, a Giv‘ati patrol re-visited Idnibba, Mughallis, Jilya, Qazaza and Sajd, killing "a handful of Arabs" in a number of clashes.

In 1955 Gefen was founded on village land, north of the village site.

In 1992 the village site was described: "The site and surrounding area are fenced in. The debris from the houses have been levelled, and one can still see building components. Remnants of a house on the east side are ringed by stone markers that formerly identified the boundaries of a home garden. Numerous trees, including olive and carob trees, grow on all sides and cactuses are found on the northern and southern edges."

References

Bibliography

External links
Welcome To Mughallis
Mughallis,  Zochrot
Oral History and Dual Marginalisation: Palestinian Peasant Women and Nakba Narratives, Abbad Yahya
Survey of Western Palestine, Map 16: IAA,  Wikimedia commons
Mughallis, from the Khalil Sakakini Cultural Center

Arab villages depopulated during the 1948 Arab–Israeli War
District of Hebron